The Brussels Congress of 1868 is the common name assigned to the 3rd General Congress of the International Workingmen's Association (IWA), generally known as the First International. The meeting was held in the city of Brussels, Belgium in September 1868.

International Workingmen's Association
September 1868 events
Events in Brussels
1868 in Belgium